7th National Board of Review Awards
December 16, 1935
The 7th National Board of Review Awards were announced on 16 December 1935.

Best American Films
The Informer
Alice Adams
Anna Karenina
David Copperfield
The Gilded Lily
Les Misérables
The Lives of a Bengal Lancer
Mutiny on the Bounty
Ruggles of Red Gap
Who Killed Cock Robin?

Top Foreign Films 
Chapayev
Crime and Punishment
Le Dernier Milliardaire
The Man Who Knew Too Much
Maria Chapdelaine
La Maternelle
The New Gulliver
Peasants
Thunder in the East
The Youth of Maxim

Winners
Best American Film: The Informer
Best Foreign Film: Chapayev, U.S.S.R.

External links
National Board of Review of Motion Pictures :: Awards for 1935

1935
1935 film awards
1935 in American cinema